Sievert Allen Rohwer (22 December 1887 in Telluride – 12 February 1951) was an American entomologist who specialized in Hymenoptera. He was a graduate of the University of Colorado. At the time of his death, Rohwer was serving as the Coordinator Defense Activities for the Agricultural Research Administration within the U.S. Department of Agriculture. Rohwer worked for the USDA from 1909 until his death.

Rohwer wrote Technical papers on miscellaneous forest insects. II. The genotypes of the sawflies or woodwasps, or the superfamily Tenthredinoidea. Technical series US Department of Agriculture, Bureau of Entomology, Washington, DC 20: 69–109 (1911) and many papers describing new species of Hymenoptera. His collection is held by the Smithsonian Institution Washington D. C.

His zoological author abbreviations is Rohwer. See Category:Taxa named by Sievert Allen Rohwer for a list of taxa authored by Rohwer which have wikipedia pages, and this query for those listed in wikidata.

Selected publications

References

See also
Bradley, J. C. 1959 The influence of the American Entomological Society upon the study of Hymenoptera. Trans. Amer. Ent. Soc. 85(4).
Mallis, A. 1971 American Entomologists.Rutgers Univ. Press New Brunswick  494-496. Portrait.

1887 births
1951 deaths
American entomologists
Hymenopterists
United States Department of Agriculture officials
20th-century American zoologists